Vitaly Viktorovich Vishnevskiy (born March 18, 1980) is a Russian former professional ice hockey defenceman. He previously played in the National Hockey League for the Mighty Ducks of Anaheim, Atlanta Thrashers, Nashville Predators, and New Jersey Devils, as well as for Lokomotiv Yaroslavl, SKA St. Petersburg and Severstal Cherepovets in the KHL.

Playing career
Vishnevsky began playing hockey in the Ukrainian SSR with his local organization Dynamo Kharkiv, but moved as a child to Russia and Torpedo Yaroslavl.

After playing in the Russian Super League for Torpedo Yaroslavl, Vishnevsky was drafted 5th overall by the Mighty Ducks of Anaheim in the 1998 NHL Entry Draft. He came to North America to start the 1999–2000 season playing for the Ducks affiliate the Cincinnati Mighty Ducks of the American Hockey League. He also made his NHL debut playing in 31 games for the Ducks.

Vishnevsky established himself as a mainstay on the Duck defense, known for his punishing checks. In the 2002–03 season he helped the Ducks reach the Stanley Cup finals. Playing in all their playoff games in their eventual defeat to the New Jersey Devils. Vitaly scored a career high 16 points (6 goals and 10 assists) in the 2003–04 NHL season. Vishnevsky returned to Russia to play for Khimik Voskresensk during the 2004–05 NHL lockout.

In the 2005–06 NHL season, Vishnevsky continued to play for the Ducks where they made their way to the conference finals before losing to the Edmonton Oilers. On August 17, 2006 Vishnevsky was traded to the Atlanta Thrashers for Karl Stewart and a 2nd round pick prior to the 2006–07 NHL season.

Vitaly played in 52 games with the Thrashers before he was  traded to the Nashville Predators for Éric Bélanger on February 10, 2007. Vishnevsky left the Predators at season's end and was signed as a free agent by the New Jersey Devils to a three-year contract on July 10, 2007. After one season of play, with the Devils, he was waived on August 22, 2008.

KHL
After Vishnevsky cleared waivers, he decided to go play in the newly formed KHL with Lokomotiv Yaroslavl on August 26, 2008. In his first season with Lokomotiv, the team made a run towards the Gagarin Cup but ultimately fell to Ak Bars Kazan in seven games. The following season, the team lost in the Conference Finals in seven games to HC MVD. After his contract expired, he signed with SKA Saint Petersburg. He then returned to Lokomotiv for another 2 years

After his contract expired once again, Vishnevskiy signed a professional tryout contract with the Anaheim Ducks, the team that had drafted him in 1998. Vishnevski was then released from his professional tryout after not appearing in a preseason game, thus making him a free agent.

After a two-year hiatus, Vishnevskiy opted to attempt a comeback to professional hockey in agreeing to a try-out with the Severstal Cherepovets on June 30, 2017. After participating in pre-season, Vishnevskiy impressed to secure a one-year deal with Severstal for the 2017–18 season on August 21, 2017. At the conclusion of the 2017-18 KHL season, Vishnevskiy retired once more.

Career statistics

Regular season and playoffs

International

References

External links

1980 births
Living people
Atlanta Thrashers players
Cincinnati Mighty Ducks players
HC Khimik Voskresensk players
Ice hockey players at the 2006 Winter Olympics
Lokomotiv Yaroslavl players
Anaheim Ducks draft picks
Mighty Ducks of Anaheim players
Nashville Predators players
National Hockey League first-round draft picks
New Jersey Devils players
Olympic ice hockey players of Russia
Russian ice hockey defencemen
Russian expatriates in the United States
Severstal Cherepovets players
SKA Saint Petersburg players
Sportspeople from Kharkiv
Ukrainian emigrants to Russia